The MarketFront is an addition to Seattle's Pike Place Market. Designed by Miller Hull Partnership, The $74 million expansion was unveiled in 2017. A grand opening was held on June 29. The MarketFront occupies the former site of the Municipal Market, demolished in 1974.

Billie the Piggybank, a 700-pound statue of a pig, was moved to the MarketFront development in late 2016.

References

External links
 

2017 establishments in Washington (state)
Buildings and structures completed in 2017
Buildings and structures in Seattle
Central Waterfront, Seattle
Pike Place Market